Ikke Bødlen is a poem by Halfdan Rasmussen, featured as one of the best poems on Human Rights on a 1979 book published by Amnesty International Denmark.

Ikke Bødlen would be later translated into the first verse of Roger Waters' song Each Small Candle

References 

Danish poetry